Madonna and Child with the Infant John the Baptist is an oil on oak panel painting by Perugino, dating to around 1497 and now in the Städel Museum in Frankfurt-am-Main

Bibliography (in Italian) 
Vittoria Garibaldi, Perugino, in Pittori del Rinascimento, Scala, Florence, 2004 
Pierluigi De Vecchi, Elda Cerchiari, I tempi dell'arte, volume 2, Bompiani, Milan, 1999. 
Stefano Zuffi, Il Quattrocento, Electa, Milan, 2004. 

1497 paintings
Paintings of the Madonna and Child by Pietro Perugino
Paintings depicting John the Baptist
Paintings in the collection of the Städel